The Brooke Alexander Gallery is an art gallery in New York City founded in 1968 by Brooke and Carolyn Alexander in a storefront on East 68th Street. It is a member of The Art Dealers Association of America and the International Fine Print Dealers Association.

History 
Brooke Alexander Gallery began by publishing artists' prints and multiples in the fall of 1968. Since then, Brooke Alexander Gallery has published over 1,500 editions. The Alexanders moved the gallery twice in the next few years and in 1972 opened at 26 East 78th Street. The gallery located to 57th Street in 1975 and regularly exhibited both paintings and prints.
In 1985 it moved to 59 Wooster Street, in the downtown area of New York City, into an art neighborhood that had been named SoHo and included 83 other art galleries. The art dealer David Zwirner got his start in the art business there.

The Alexanders separated in the early 1990s, and Mr. Brooke Alexander, whose brother was the artist Peter Alexander became the sole owner/director of the gallery. In 1995, Carolyn Alexander joined with prior Brooke Alexander Gallery director, Ted Bonin, to create the Alexander and Bonin Gallery. In 1997, Alexander and Bonin moved to a three story building in Chelsea, and in 2016 moved to 47 Walker Street in Tribeca.

Notice and influence 
The Brooke Alexander Gallery has been noted for its influence on the late-20th century art scene in New York. Recognizing this, in 1994, 25 years of work at the Brooke Alexander Gallery was honored at the Smithsonian Institution. Wendy Weitman, from the Department of Prints and Illustrated Books at the Museum of Modern Art has said that "Brooke Alexander began publishing prints and multiples in the fall of 1968. [...[ Surveying his publications thus offers a particularly dynamic view of American printmaking of the last quarter century".

Artists
Besides for the publication of Minimalist art prints, the gallery is known for the Colab artists (and friends) it represented in the 1980s and whose careers it helped launch, including:
John Ahearn
Richard Bosman
Jane Dickson
Jenny Holzer
Robert Longo
Matt Mullican
Joseph Nechvatal
Tom Otterness
Raymond Pettibon
Judy Rifka
Walter Robinson
Kiki Smith
Paul Thek
Robin Winters

In addition to these artists, Brooke Alexander Gallery also publishes and handles work by: 
 Donald Judd
 Sol LeWitt
 Bruce Nauman
 Barnett Newman
 Claes Oldenburg
 Robert Rauschenberg
 Ed Ruscha
 Fred Sandback
 Sean Scully
 Richard Tuttle
 Lorna Simpson
 Lawrence Weiner
 Josef Albers
 Richard Artschwager
 John Baldessari
 Joseph Cornell
 Sam Francis
 Philip Guston
 Jasper Johns
 Ellsworth Kelly
 Robert Mangold
 Richard Long

References

External links

Contemporary art galleries in the United States
1968 establishments in New York City
Art museums and galleries in Manhattan
Art galleries established in 1968